Chatham Island is located in the South Ward (Walpole) of Manjimup Shire in the Great Southern region of Western Australia.

Named as Cape Chatham by George Vancouver aboard HMS Discovery in 1791, the island was subsequently renamed as Chatham Island.

References

Nature reserves in Western Australia
Islands of the Great Southern (Western Australia)